Gliese may refer to:
 Rochus Gliese (1891—1978), a German actor, director, production designer, and art director
 Wilhelm Gliese (1915–1993), a German astronomer, best known for the Gliese Catalogue of Nearby Stars
 Gliese Catalogue of Nearby Stars, a modern star catalog of stars located within 25 parsecs of the Earth
 Any of the stars in this catalog; see :Category:Gliese and GJ objects